Megarock Records was a Swedish record label which focused on heavy metal music. It was located in Stockholm.

Bands
 Abstrakt Algebra
 Ace's High
 Alien
 Backyard Babies
 Bad Habit
 Candlemass
 Criss
 Crossroad Jam
 It's Alive
 Jester
 Landberk
 Machine Gun Kelly
 Megaton
 Misha Calvin
 Nocturnal Rites
 Passion Street
 Pole Position
 The Quill
 Renegade
 Schizophrenic Circus
 Shadowseeds 
 Slam St Joan
 Sphinx
 Ten Foot Pole (Sweden)
 Therion
 Tungsten
 Walk the Wire

See also
 List of record labels

External links
 Megarock Records
 MEGAROCK @ anormus - list of all releases

Swedish record labels
Heavy metal record labels